Paolo Oberti, O.P. (died 1567) was a Roman Catholic prelate who served as Bishop of Venosa (1567).

Biography
Paolo Oberti was ordained a priest in the Dominican Order. On 17 February 1567, he was appointed during the papacy of Pope Pius V as Bishop of Venosa.

On 24 February 1567, he was consecrated bishop by Marcantonio Maffei, Archbishop of Chieti, with Antonio Fioribello, Bishop Emeritus of Lavello, and Egidio Valenti, Bishop of Nepi e Sutri, serving as co-consecrators. He served as Bishop of Venosa until his death on 13 September 1567.

References

External links and additional sources
 (for Chronology of Bishops) 
 (for Chronology of Bishops) 

16th-century Italian Roman Catholic bishops
Bishops appointed by Pope Pius V
1567 deaths
Dominican bishops